Abdelhalim Ourradi (born March 19, 1981) is an Algerian boxer. He won the 2007 All-African title in the bantamweight division and qualified for the 2008 Summer Olympics for his native North African country.

Career
At the African Championships in 2005, Ouradi lost the semifinal in the flyweight division to Walid Cherif. He then moved up to bantamweight, where he lost to Bruno Julie at the African Championships in May 2007.

At the 2007 All-Africa Games in Algeria, he defeated Julie in the semifinals and Ghanaian Issa Samir in the final.

Ouradi won the gold medal in the 51 kg division at the African Olympic Qualifying Tournament in Algiers, Algeria, where he beat Moroccan boxer Mesbahi Hicham 6:0 in the final.. He later won the Ahmet Comert Cup tournament.

At the Olympics, Ouradi was defeated by Irish boxer John Joe Nevin 4:9.

In 2009, Ouradi upset world class local hero Bruno Julie in a rematch and won the African Championships in Mauritius.

References
sports-reference
African Championships 2007
AllAfrica 2007
African Championships 2009
Qualifier
Bio

1981 births
Living people
Flyweight boxers
Boxers at the 2008 Summer Olympics
Olympic boxers of Algeria
Algerian male boxers
African Games gold medalists for Algeria
African Games medalists in boxing
Competitors at the 2007 All-Africa Games
21st-century Algerian people
20th-century Algerian people